The 22649/50 Yercaud Express is an express train operated by the Southern Railway zone of the Indian Railways, connecting Erode and Chennai in Tamil Nadu.

Good train mainly for Erode passengers and also supposed to be considered as the last train which stops at Walajapet, Morappur, Bommidi, Sankari. Secondly this train also shares its rakes with 12603/12604 Chennai–Hyderabad Superfast Express.

Arrival and departure
 Train number 22649 departs from MGR Chennai Central at 23:00 and reaches Erode Junction at 5:50.
 Train number 22650 departs Erode Junction at 21:00 and reaches MGR Chennai Central at 03:45.

Loco link
It is hauled by an Erode-based WAP-4 or WAP-7 regularly.

Stoppages

 Chennai
 Perambur
 Tiruvallur 
 Arakkonam
 Katpadi
 Jolarpettai
 Tirupattur
 Samalpatti
 Morappur
 Bommidi
 Salem
 Sankari
 Erode

See also
 Yelagiri Express
 Cheran Express
 Blue mountain Express
 Coimbatore chennai central weekly express
 Coimbatore Express
 Kovai Express
 Coimbatore shadabti express
 Salem chennai express

References

Transport in Chennai
Transport in Erode
Express trains in India
Rail transport in Tamil Nadu
Named passenger trains of India